Alejandro Yrizar (born 30 January 1965) is a Mexican modern pentathlete. He competed at the 1984, 1988 and 1992 Summer Olympics.

References

External links
 

1965 births
Living people
Mexican male modern pentathletes
Olympic modern pentathletes of Mexico
Modern pentathletes at the 1984 Summer Olympics
Modern pentathletes at the 1988 Summer Olympics
Modern pentathletes at the 1992 Summer Olympics